Imran Khalid Butt is a Pakistani politician who had been a Member of the Provincial Assembly of the Punjab from August 2018 till January 2023. Previously, he was a Member of the Provincial Assembly of the Punjab, from 2008 to May 2018.

Early life and education
He was born on 3 July 1977 in Gujranwala.

He graduated from University of the Punjab in 1997 and has a degree of Bachelor of Arts.

Political career
He ran for the seat of the Provincial Assembly of the Punjab as a candidate of Pakistan Muslim League (N) (PML-N) from Constituency PP-91 (Gujranwala-I) in 2002 Pakistani general election, but was unsuccessful. He received 12,362 votes and lost the seat to Chaudhry Muhammad Ashraf Khumbo, a candidate of Pakistan Peoples Party (PPP).

He was elected to the Provincial Assembly of the Punjab as a candidate of PML-N from Constituency PP-91 (Gujranwala-I) in 2008 Pakistani general election. He received 22,939 votes and defeated Rana Faisal Rauf Khan, a candidate of PPP.

He was re-elected to the Provincial Assembly of the Punjab as a candidate of PML-N from Constituency PP-91 (Gujranwala-I) in 2013 Pakistani general election. He received 34,075 votes and defeated an independent candidate, Rizwan Ullah Butt.

In December 2013, he was appointed as Parliamentary Secretary for industries & commerce.

He was re-elected to Provincial Assembly of the Punjab as a candidate of PML-N from Constituency PP-54 (Gujranwala-IV) in 2018 Pakistani general election.

References

1977 births
Living people
Punjab MPAs 2013–2018
Pakistan Muslim League (N) MPAs (Punjab)
Punjab MPAs 2008–2013
Punjab MPAs 2018–2023